Circumstantial Evidence is a 1945 American film noir directed by John Larkin and starring Michael O'Shea, Lloyd Nolan, and Trudy Marshall.

Plot
Three witnesses swear they saw Joe Reynolds murder grumpy baker Kenny (Ben Welden) with a hatchet. Joe claims Kenny's fatal head wound was the result of a fall as they argued—the baker hit his head on an oven as he fell—but the eyewitness testimony prevails and Joe is sentenced to death in the electric chair. His buddy Sam Lord has an uphill struggle to prove his innocence.

Cast
 Michael O'Shea as Joe Reynolds
 Lloyd Nolan as Sam Lord
 Trudy Marshall as Agnes Hannon
 Billy Cummings as Pat Reynolds
 Ruth Ford as Mrs. Simms
 Reed Hadley as Prosecutor
 Roy Roberts as Marty Hannon
 Scotty Beckett as Freddy Hanlon

Uncredited (in order of appearance)

Critical reception
Bosley Crowther, the film critic for The New York Times panned the film, writing, "Darryl Zanuck must have had his back turned when Circumstantial Evidence slipped out the front gate of the Twentieth Century-Fox Studio. For a sillier and more tediously worked-out piece of crime melodrama than the picture which opened yesterday at the Rialto hasn't reached Broadway in a long, long time. Circumstantial Evidence is so full of hackneyed and incredible plot turns that one can never get even slightly interested in the involved set of circumstances which almost send a quite innocent, if belligerent, Michael O'Shea to the electric chair."

References

External links
 
 
 

1945 films
1945 drama films
20th Century Fox films
American black-and-white films
Film noir
Films scored by David Buttolph
American drama films
1940s English-language films
1940s American films